Hardaway is an unincorporated community in Macon County, Alabama, United States, located  southwest of Tuskegee. Hardaway has a post office with ZIP code 36039.

Demographics

From 1900 to 1920, Hardaway was listed as a village in 1900 & 1910 and as an incorporated town on the U.S. Census in 1920. It did not appear on the census after that point, likely due to disincorporation.

References

Unincorporated communities in Macon County, Alabama
Unincorporated communities in Alabama